Pilot Grove Township is an inactive township in Moniteau County, in the U.S. state of Missouri.

Pilot Grove Township was established in 1854, taking its name from Pilot Branch.

References

Townships in Missouri
Townships in Moniteau County, Missouri
Jefferson City metropolitan area